Ervin Abel (8 November 1929 Narva – 16 March 1984 Tallinn) was an Estonian actor.

In 1953 he graduated from GITIS' Estonian studio. 1953–1966 he worked at Estonian Drama Theatre and 1966-1984 at Estonian SSR State Philharmonic (nowadays Eesti Kontsert). Besides theatre roles he played also in several films.

Filmography

 1964: Põrgupõhja uus Vanapagan (feature film; in the role: Ditchdigger)
 1965: The Lark
 1968: Mehed ei nuta (television feature film; in the role: Abel)
 1969: Kevade (feature film; in the role: Papa Kiir)
 1972: Noor pensionär (television feature film; in the role: Pukspuu)
 1976: Suvi (feature film; in the role: Papa Kiir)
 1978: Siin me oleme! (television feature film; in the role: John)

References

1929 births
1984 deaths
Estonian male stage actors
Estonian male film actors
Estonian male television actors
Estonian male radio actors
20th-century Estonian male actors
People from Narva